Dal Bahadur Sunar is a Nepali politician belonging to CPN (Unified Socialist) and is coincharge of the party for Lumbini Province. He has served as a member of the 2nd Nepalese Constituent Assembly. He had won the Banke 4 seat in CA assembly, 2013 from the Communist Party of Nepal (Unified Marxist–Leninist).

References

Communist Party of Nepal (Unified Socialist) politicians
Living people
1959 births
People from Surkhet District
Members of the 2nd Nepalese Constituent Assembly